Michał Józef Listkiewicz (born May 20, 1953) is a retired Polish football referee, former president of Polish Football Association. He graduated from Warsaw University in 1977.

He was a football referee since 1973, officiating internationally since 1983. Referee of the World Cup in Italy 1990, included final match and USA 1994, also Euro 1988 and Olympic Games in Seoul 1988.

Since 1989 at the Polish Football Association: Press officer, Deputy General Secretary, General Secretary, Vice-President. From June 1999 to October 2008 President of Polish FA. On 8 July 2016 he became chairman of referees committee of Football Association of the Czech Republic.

Besides his native Polish, he also speaks fluent Hungarian, English, German, Russian and Finnish.

References

Profile

1953 births
Living people
Polish football referees
1990 FIFA World Cup referees
FIFA World Cup referees
Sportspeople from Warsaw